Sunday Maweni (born 1 January 1959) is a Botswana sprinter. He competed in the men's 400 metres at the 1988 Summer Olympics.

References

External links
 

1959 births
Living people
Athletes (track and field) at the 1988 Summer Olympics
Botswana male sprinters
Olympic athletes of Botswana
Commonwealth Games competitors for Botswana
Athletes (track and field) at the 1986 Commonwealth Games
Place of birth missing (living people)